Daniel Scott Kooistra [KOO-struh] (born October 14, 1980) is a former American football offensive tackle. He played college football at North Carolina State and was drafted by the Cincinnati Bengals in the seventh round of the 2003 NFL Draft. Kooistra was also a member of the Cleveland Browns, Baltimore Ravens and Minnesota Vikings.

Early years
Kooistra was born in Madison Wisconsin. He attended East Cary Middle School where he made the A/B Honor Role in eighth grade. He played high school football for Cary High School in Cary, North Carolina where he was a "crowd favorite." Koostra started for two years, playing offensive and defensive tackle. Cary Coach Jay DeJeet said, "He is a very athletic big man and his footwork is exceptional."

College career
Kooistra attended North Carolina State University on scholarship. He started every game as a tackle as a junior and a senior. As a senior in 2002, Kooistra was starting tackle for team that posted 11–3 record, capped by a win in the Gator Bowl. He was a History major while at NC State.

Professional career

Cincinnati Bengals
Kooistra was drafted by the Cincinnati Bengals in the seventh round (215th overall) of the 2003 NFL Draft. He made his NFL debut versus the Denver Broncos on September 7. In his first season, he played in eight games. In 2004, he played in all 16 games and in both the 2005 and 2006 seasons he played in 15 games.

On January 30, 2007, Kooistra was tendered a 3-year deal with the Bengals keeping him in Cincinnati through the 2009 season. Kooistra was waived by the Bengals on November 3, 2009. He was re-signed on November 9, but waived again on November 24.

Cleveland Browns
Kooistra signed with the Cleveland Browns on December 22, 2009 after quarterback Brady Quinn was placed on injured reserve. Kooistra was waived on December 26 when the team promoted practice squad linebacker Titus Brown. Kooista was re-signed on December 29 after the team waived linebacker Arnold Harrison, but waived again on January 1, 2010 after defensive end Titus Adams was claimed off waivers.

Kooistra was re-signed to a future contract by the Browns on January 5, 2010. Kooistra was cut on September 4.

Baltimore Ravens
Kooistra signed with the Baltimore Ravens on October 5, 2010.

References

External links
Cincinnati Bengals bio
Cleveland Browns bio

1980 births
Living people
Sportspeople from Madison, Wisconsin
People from Cary, North Carolina
Players of American football from Wisconsin
Players of American football from North Carolina
American football offensive tackles
American football offensive guards
American football tight ends
NC State Wolfpack football players
Cincinnati Bengals players
Cleveland Browns players
Baltimore Ravens players